HMS Ferret was an Acheron-class destroyer of the Royal Navy that served during World War I and was sold for breaking in 1921.  She was the sixteenth Royal Navy ship to be named after the domestic mammal Mustela putorius.

Construction
She was built under the 1910-11 shipbuilding programme by J. Samuel White & Company of Cowes. She had three Parsons turbines, and three White-Forster boilers. Capable of 30 knots, she carried two 4-inch guns, other smaller guns and two 21 inch (533 mm) torpedo tubes and had a complement of 72 men. She was launched on 12 April 1911.

Pennant numbers

Career

Pre-War

Ferret served with the First Destroyer Flotilla from 1911 and, with her flotilla, joined the British Grand Fleet in 1914 on the outbreak of World War I.

The Battle of Heligoland Bight
She was present with First Destroyer Flotilla on 28 August 1914 at the Battle of Heligoland Bight, led by the light cruiser Fearless, and shared in the prize money for the battle.  Ferret was not present with her flotilla at the Battle of Jutland on 31 May 1916 but she continued to serve with the First Destroyer Flotilla screening the Grand Fleet until November 1916 when she was one of seven destroyers to stay with the flotilla when was assigned to operate with the Third Battle Squadron.

Torpedoed
On 18 January 1917 she was torpedoed by the German submarine UC 21 south-east of St. Catherine's Point. Able Seaman George Keeble died of wounds inflicted during the attack, but the ship was not fatally damaged, and she was returned to service.

Conversion to minelayer
In 1917 the Acheron-class destroyers Ferret, Sandfly and Ariel were converted to minelaying destroyers, capable of carrying 40 mines.  Ferret started serving with the 7th Flotilla on the East Coast of England in July 1917 and thence to the 20th Flotilla in March 1918, from which she operated out of Immingham.

Minelaying operations in the Heligoland Bight
The provision of converted minelaying destroyers and the availability of reliable H2-pattern mines allowed the greatest allied minelaying operation of World War I - the attempt to close Heligoland Bight to German ships and submarines. Ferret, with her sisters, was employed on this work until the end of the war. All three vessels were sunk and 72 prisoners were captured.

Disposal
In common with most of her class, she was laid up after World War I, and on 9 May 1921 she was sold to Ward for breaking.

References

Acheron-class destroyers
World War I destroyers of the United Kingdom
Ships built on the Isle of Wight
1911 ships
Maritime incidents in 1917